Alex Rogers may refer to:

 Alex Rogers (rugby union) (born 1986), rugby union player
 Alex Rogers (biologist), professor of conservation biology